Eduardo Alonso Nájera Pérez (born July 11, 1976) is a Mexican former professional basketball player who is currently a scout for the Dallas Mavericks of the National Basketball Association (NBA). He is also a pregame and postgame analyst on Mavericks Live on Fox Sports Southwest, where he is identified as Eddie. Before being promoted to a scout with the Mavs, he was head coach of the Texas Legends of the NBA D-League.

Personal information
Nájera was only the second Mexican-born NBA player (Horacio Llamas was the first) and was the first Mexican player to be drafted. He is the son of Servando Nájera and Rosa Irene Pérez.

College basketball
Nájera played college basketball at the University of Oklahoma, in Norman, Oklahoma, United States, from 1997 to 2000, becoming a major star there.  He helped the team to four consecutive NCAA tournament appearances during his college career, as well as finishing in the school's all-time top ten in nine statistical categories. Before being drafted into the NBA in 2000, Nájera received rave reviews from scouts, who boasted on Nájera's quick first step and extraordinary rebounding ability. He is only the second Mexican-born player to join the NBA. He was the first Mexican player to be drafted into the NBA (Horacio Llamas being undrafted).

Nájera played for the Mexican team in the 1997 World University Games and helped them achieve a fourth-place finish in the 1999 World University Games.

Professional career

Dallas Mavericks (2000–2004) 
He saw significant action as a member of the Dallas Mavericks in 2000–01 and 2001–02, but recurrent knee injuries limited his action in his last two years in Dallas.

He coached at the first-ever Basketball Without Borders Americas tournament in Rio de Janeiro, Brazil, during the 2004 NBA Summer of Goodwill.

Golden State Warriors (2004–2005) 
On August 24, 2004, Nájera was traded along with Luis Flores, Christian Laettner, Mladen Sekularac, cash, a 2007 first round draft pick, and another future first round draft pick to the Golden State Warriors in exchange for Erick Dampier, Dan Dickau, Evan Eschmeyer, and Steve Logan. In Golden State, Najera again put in modest minutes and was a solid contributor.

Denver Nuggets (2005–2008) 

On February 24, 2005, Nájera was then sent to the Denver Nuggets along with Luis Flores and a future first round pick in exchange for Nikoloz Tskitishvili and Rodney White, where he would have some of his most productive seasons as an NBA player.

Also in 2006, an exhibition match was played in Monterrey, Mexico, between the Golden State Warriors and the Denver Nuggets.

On April 27, 2006, Nájera started his first playoff game for the Nuggets in Game 3 of their first round series facing the Los Angeles Clippers. He replaced Kenyon Martin who was suspended indefinitely for "conduct detrimental to the team".

He was partly involved in the December 2006 Knicks–Nuggets brawl. While not involved in the actual fighting, he did try to separate the players. He was ejected from the game for leaving the bench.

New Jersey Nets (2008–2010) 
On July 11, 2008, Nájera signed a contract with the New Jersey Nets for 4 years $12 million. He stated that he would make it a point to turn the Nets' young forwards Yi Jianlian and Ryan Anderson and center Brook Lopez into stronger, tougher players. Nájera turned down more money and a chance to return to his college state, Oklahoma City Thunder. He also turned down an offer from the New Orleans Hornets in order to take a chance to lead a young and talented New Orleans team.

Return to Dallas (2010–2011) 
On January 11, 2010, Nájera was traded to the Dallas Mavericks for Kris Humphries and Shawne Williams.

Charlotte Bobcats (2010–2012) 
On July 13, 2010, Nájera was traded to the Charlotte Bobcats along with Erick Dampier and Matt Carroll in exchange for Tyson Chandler and Alexis Ajinça. Nájera's final NBA game ever was played on April 6th, 2012 in a 90–95 loss to the Milwaukee Bucks where he only played for two minutes and recorded no stats, suffering a career-ending facial injury.

Coaching career
In 2012, after he retired as a player, Nájera became head coach of the NBA D-League's Texas Legends. Prior to the 2015–16 season, Texas replaced him with his assistant coach, Nick Van Exel.

Off the court
In 2000, Eduardo Nájera was named Third Team All-American by both the Associated Press and the National Association of Basketball Coaches, being the first Mexican-born to be named so.

In 2000, Nájera graduated from the University of Oklahoma with a degree in sociology.

In the same year, he received the Chip Hilton Player of the Year Award from the Basketball Hall of Fame, an award given to a player who has demonstrated personal character both on and off the court.

In 2001, Nájera served as the United Nations Drug Control Programme Goodwill Ambassador for Sports Against Drugs. In 2004, he established the Eduardo Najera Foundation for Latino Achievement, which provides college scholarships for outstanding Latino students facing barriers to their educations, and in 2006, he received the Chopper Travaglini Award for demonstrating outstanding charity work in the Denver community.

NBA career statistics

Regular season 

|-
| align="left" | 
| align="left" | Dallas
| 40 || 4 || 10.8 || .523 || .333 || .424 || 2.4 || .7 || .3 || .2 || 3.3
|-
| align="left" | 
| align="left" | Dallas
| 62 || 11 || 21.9 || .500 || .000 || .676 || 5.5 || .6 || .9 || .5 || 6.5
|-
| align="left" | 
| align="left" | Dallas
| 48 || 12 || 23.0 || .558 || .000 || .681 || 4.6 || 1.0 || .8 || .5 || 6.7

|-
| align="left" | 
| align="left" | Dallas
| 58 || 7 || 12.4 || .444 || .500 || .652 || 2.7 || .4 || .6 || .3 || 3.0
|-
| align="left" | 
| align="left" | Golden State
| 42 || 4 || 14.5 || .407 || .400 || .644 || 2.8 || .9 || .4 || .2 || 4.2
|-
| align="left" | 
| align="left" | Denver
| 26 || 0 || 22.1 || .500 || .000 || .630 || 4.8 || 1.1 || .9 || .5 || 6.9
|-
| align="left" | 
| align="left" | Denver
| 64 || 3 || 22.6 || .422 || .333 || .781 || 5.1 || .8 || .8 || .5 || 5.4
|-
| align="left" | 
| align="left" | Denver
| 75 || 36 || 22.1 || .576 || .083 || .715 || 4.1 || .9 || 1.0 || .3 || 6.6
|-
| align="left" | 
| align="left" | Denver
| 78 || 3 || 21.3 || .473 || .361 || .708 || 4.3 || 1.2 || .9 || .5 || 5.9
|-
| align="left" | 
| align="left" | New Jersey
| 27 || 0 || 11.8 || .446 || .200 || .364 || 2.5 || .7 || .4 || .1 || 2.9
|-
| align="left" | 
| align="left" | New Jersey
| 13 || 2 || 15.7 || .377 || .176 || .500 || 2.9 || 1.2 || .7 || .2 || 3.8
|-
| align="left" | 
| align="left" | Dallas
| 33 || 3 || 14.6 || .452 || .340 || .667 || 2.3 || .4 || .5 || .4 || 3.3
|-
| align="left" | 
| align="left" | Charlotte
| 31 || 0 || 12.0 || .361 || .324 || .545 || 1.4 || .6 || .4 || .2 || 2.2
|-
| align="left" | 
| align="left" | Charlotte
| 22 || 0 || 12.3 || .375 || .276 || .500 || 2.3 || .5 || .9 || .2 || 2.6
|- class="sortbottom"
| style="text-align:center;" colspan="2"| Career
| 619 || 85 || 18.1 || .481 || .311 || .671 || 3.7 || .8 || .7 || .4 || 4.9

Playoffs 

|-
| align="left" | 2001
| align="left" | Dallas
| 7 || 0 || 6.3 || .529 || .750 || .000 || 2.1 || .1 || .1 || .1 || 3.0
|-
| align="left" | 2002
| align="left" | Dallas
| 8 || 4 || 15.3 || .696 || .000 || .625 || 1.6 || .1 || .4 || .0 || 4.6
|-
| align="left" | 2003
| align="left" | Dallas
| 19 || 5 || 20.7 || .453 || .000 || .792 || 3.9 || .8 || .7 || .2 || 6.1
|-
| align="left" | 2004
| align="left" | Dallas
| 5 || 0 || 11.4 || .455 || .000 || 1.000 || 3.4 || .6 || .6 || .4 || 2.4
|-
| align="left" | 2005
| align="left" | Denver
| 2 || 0 || 6.5 || .000 || .000 || .000 || 1.0 || .5 || .0 || .0 || .0
|-
| align="left" | 2006
| align="left" | Denver
| 4 || 3 || 22.3 || .214 || .000 || .500 || 3.8 || .5 || .8 || .0 || 2.0
|-
| align="left" | 2007
| align="left" | Denver
| 5 || 0 || 19.2 || .235 || .000 || .500 || 5.6 || .4 || .4 || .2 || 1.8
|-
| align="left" | 2008
| align="left" | Denver
| 4 || 0 || 19.5 || .500 || .400 || .000 || 3.3 || 1.5 || .8 || .3 || 4.0
|-
| align="left" | 2010
| align="left" | Dallas
| 5 || 0 || 7.2 || .250 || .000 || .000 || 1.8 || .0 || .4 || .0 || .8
|- class="sortbottom"
| style="text-align:center;" colspan="2"| Career
| 59 || 12 || 15.7 || .443 || .294 || .750 || 3.2 || .5 || .5 || .2 || 3.8

Career highs 
Points: 19: 2 times
Rebounds: 15: vs. Houston 04/11/02
Assists: 7: @ Milwaukee 01/09/09
Steals: 6: 2 times
Blocks: 4: vs. Seattle 12/29/05

References

External links

1976 births
Living people
All-American college men's basketball players
Basketball players from Chihuahua
Charlotte Bobcats players
Dallas Mavericks players
Denver Nuggets players
Golden State Warriors players
Houston Rockets draft picks
Mexican men's basketball players
National Basketball Association players from México
Mexican emigrants to the United States
Mexican expatriate basketball people in the United States
New Jersey Nets players
Oklahoma Sooners men's basketball players
Small forwards
Texas Legends coaches
Dallas Mavericks scouts